Baldy is a  mountain located  north-northeast of Talent and  east-northeast of Phoenix in Jackson County, Oregon.

References

Mountains of Jackson County, Oregon
Mountains of Oregon